Catalan-language television channels include the following:

Regional channels

Local channels

Alghero

Alt Camp, Conca de Barberà and Tarragonès

Alt Empordà

Alt Pirineu

Andorra

Baix Camp and Priorat

Baix Empordà

Baix Llobregat

Bages, Berguedà and Solsonès

Barcelonès

Garrotxa and Ripollès

Gironès and Pla de l'Estany

Horta, Safor and Vall d'Albaida

Mallorca

Segrià

Selva

Terres de l'Ebre

Terres de Ponent

Vallès Occidental

Other channels

Closed channels

References

See also
Lists of television channels

Catalan
Catalan-language television stations